Wild Planet is an album by the B-52's.

Wild Planet may also refer to:

 The Wild Planet, a 1973 animated film
 Wild Planet (compilation album) a compilation album by Nettwerk
 Wild Planet, guitarist for the punk band !Action Pact!

See also
 Wild, Wild Planet, a 1966 Italian science fiction film